Poisoned Pen Press is a publisher of mystery fiction based in Scottsdale, Arizona, US. Poisoned Pen Press typically publishes thirty-six new hardcover mysteries per year, thirty-six new large type editions of those hardcovers, and between thirty and forty new trade paperback editions of previously published hardcovers. Audio books of new titles are produced by Blackstone Audio.

History
Poisoned Pen Press was founded in 1997 by Barbara G. Peters, Robert Rosenwald, and their daughter, Susan Malling. Peters, who had founded Scottsdale Arizona's 'The Poisoned Pen, A Mystery Bookstore' a decade ago, sees consolidations in the publishing industry as a threat to cultural diversity and to the survival of the independent bookstore.

Poisoned Pen Press began by selling out-of-print books, but soon expanded to publish original titles. They earned two Edgar Award nominations (1998 and 2000) and many of their books receive positive reviews in trade publications and general press.

Poisoned Pen Press was acquired by Sourcebooks in 2018.

The Poisoned Pencil 
In 2012, The Poisoned Pencil, an imprint of Poisoned Pen Press, was founded to publish mysteries for young adults. Ellen Larson was named editor of The Poisoned Pencil. The first release from The Poisoned Pencil was Death Spiral, by Janie Chodosh, on April 1, 2014. When Poisoned Pen Press was acquired by Sourcebooks in 2018, The Poisoned Pencil was merged into Sourcebooks' young adult imprint, Sourcebooks Fire.

Awards and recognition
In recognition of Barbara Peters' and Robert Rosenwald's contribution to the publishing industry, they received the Lifetime Achievement Award at the 2008 Bouchercon Crime and Mystery conference.

On April 29, 2010, at the Mystery Writers of America's 64th annual Edgar Awards dinner, Barbara Peters and Robert Rosenwald were given the Ellery Queen Award, which honors "writing teams and outstanding people in the mystery-publishing industry".

Notable authors
Notable authors the company has published include:

 James Anderson
 Robert Barnard
 Claudia Bishop
 Kate Charles
 Ruth Dudley Edwards
 Martin Edwards
 Kerry Greenwood
 Steven F. Havill
 Libby Fischer Hellmann
 H.R.F. Keating
 Laurie R. King
 Ken Kuhlken
 Edward Marston
 Peter May
 Val McDermid
 Keith Miles
 Susan Moody
 Paul Moorcraft
 Michael Norman
 Barbara G. Peters
 James Sallis
 Rick Shefchik
 David Waltner-Toews
 Betty Webb
 Joseph Jefferson Farjeon

See also
Sweeping Up Glass

References

External links
 
 Article in The Drood Review by Barbara Peters
 Interview with Robert Rosenwald in The Mystery Reader

Book publishing companies of the United States
Companies based in Scottsdale, Arizona
Publishing companies established in 1997
American companies established in 1997
1997 establishments in Arizona